Nigel Hunt (born 14 May 1983 in Apia, Samoa) is a New Zealand rugby union player who most famously played for the New Zealand Sevens team. He achieved a Gold Medal along with his NZ Sevens teammates at the 2006 Commonwealth games in Melbourne. Hunt was a member of both NZ Sevens squads that won the Sevens World Circuits in 2006 and 2007.

He currently plays for French Top 14 Rugby Union club Grenoble, having previously turned out for New Zealand National Provincial Championship side Bay of Plenty and Wellington.

Teams
 Grenoble (France) 2010 – present
 Bay of Plenty 2008–2009
 NZ Sevens 2005–2007
 Wellington 2004–2006
 Wellington Under 21 2002
 Wellington Rugbyleague bartercard cup 2003
 Tawa R.F.C. 2002–2004
 Porirua R.F.C. 2000–2001

References

External links
 All Blacks Profile
 

1983 births
Bay of Plenty rugby union players
Commonwealth Games gold medallists for New Zealand
Living people
New Zealand rugby union players
Rugby sevens players at the 2006 Commonwealth Games
Wellington rugby union players
New Zealand international rugby sevens players
Sportspeople from Apia
Commonwealth Games rugby sevens players of New Zealand
Commonwealth Games medallists in rugby sevens
Medallists at the 2006 Commonwealth Games